Master of Science in Global Finance (MSGF) program is a one-year executive-format master's degree program jointly offered by Hong Kong University of Science and Technology and NYU Stern School of Business since 2007.

Students have access to resources at both schools and are members of each school's alumni network.  The current cohort comes with an average work experience of 10 years, and represent 17 nationalities from 12 work locations.

The MSGF program takes place over one year, and consists of seven modules - four in Hong Kong, two in New York City and one in Shanghai. Students receive a Master of Science issued jointly by the two universities. Topics covered include the following:
 Global Macro & Asian Markets
 Foundations of Corporate Finance
 Foundations of Investments
 Asset Allocation
 Derivatives Markets
 Fixed Income Instruments & Markets
 Applied Corporate Finance & Valuation
 FinTech
 Financial Markets and Corporate Finance in China
 Risk Management in Financial Institutions
 Topics in Financial Markets & Innovation

See also
 Master of Science in Finance
 Stern Global Programs

External links
 Master of Science in Global Finance Program - official site 

Master's degrees
Business qualifications